Pool 2 of the Second Round of the 2006 World Baseball Classic was held at Hiram Bithorn Stadium, San Juan, Puerto Rico from March 12 to 15, 2006.

Like the first round, Pool 2 was a round-robin tournament. The final two teams advanced to the semifinals.

Standings

Results
All times are Atlantic Standard Time (UTC−04:00).

Cuba 7, Venezuela 2

Puerto Rico 7, Dominican Republic 1

Dominican Republic 7, Cuba 3

Venezuela 6, Puerto Rico 0

Dominican Republic 2, Venezuela 1

Cuba 4, Puerto Rico 3

External links
Official website

Pool 2
World Baseball Classic Pool 2
21st century in San Juan, Puerto Rico
International baseball competitions hosted by Puerto Rico
World Baseball Classic Pool 2
Sports in San Juan, Puerto Rico